Liu Chao (born 7 September 1987 in Beijing) is a Chinese football player who currently plays for Beijing BSU in the China League One.

Club career
Liu started his professional career with Anhui Jiufang in 2005 and transferred to another China League Two club Tianjin Songjiang in 2007. He was described by Tianjin Songjiang boss Hao Haidong as being a hot prospect for the future.

Liu was loaned out to Chinese Super League club Shenzhen Ruby in 2009 where throughout the season he steadily established himself in Shenzhen and scored his first CSL goal against Shaanxi Chanba in a 1-0 win on April 4.  By the end of the campaign he played in 28 league games and scored 2 goals within the 2009 season.

Liu moved to Lithuania and signed a contract with FK Sūduva in 2010, which made him the first Chinese footballer playing in Lithuania. He scored his first goal for the club in second legs of Lithuanian Cup Semifinals against FK Vėtra on 14 April. He scored his first league goal three days later, in a 5-0 away win against FK Atletas Kaunas.

On 14 February 2011, Liu signed a three-year-contract with Shenzhen Ruby.

On 5 March 2015, Liu transferred to fellow China League One side Hunan Billows.

On 14 January 2016, Liu transferred to fellow China League One side Shanghai Shenxin.

Career statistics 
Statistics accurate as of match played 31 December 2020.

References

External links
Player profile at Sodasoccer.com
 

1987 births
Living people
Chinese footballers
Footballers from Beijing
Chinese expatriate footballers
Anhui Jiufang players
Tianjin Tianhai F.C. players
Shenzhen F.C. players
FK Sūduva Marijampolė players
Hunan Billows players
Shanghai Shenxin F.C. players
Expatriate footballers in Lithuania
Chinese expatriate sportspeople in Lithuania
A Lyga players
Chinese Super League players
China League One players
Association football defenders
Association football midfielders